Fee areas of the National Park System comprise a minority of the areas of the United States National Park System administered by the National Park Service. A majority of sites are fee-free areas.

The list below includes all areas that charge an entrance or standard amenity fee; generally not included are sites that only charge expanded amenity fees such as those for camping, boat launching, and parking. Sites where nearly all visitors purchase these additional amenities, such as areas with caves that require fee-based guided tours for cave access, are also generally not included. Many areas listed have parts where fees do not apply. Each year, there are a handful of free entrance days when entrance fees are waived at these areas.

Fees are given on a per-vehicle or per-person basis. Per-vehicle fees admit all occupants of a private passenger vehicle, generally for 7-days (unless otherwise noted). Most per-vehicle sites also offer passes for individuals arriving on foot, bicycle, or motorcycle; these are not listed. Fees do not apply to children age 15 or younger unless otherwise noted. All sites accept America the Beautiful Passes to waive entrance fees, which have been described as one of the best deals in recreation. Most fee areas also offer an annual area-specific pass for those who visit the same area often.


List
Bold indicates national parks.

History
On October 24, 2017, Secretary of the Interior Zinke proposed large fee hikes at seventeen of the most visited national parks in order to address a backlog of maintenance at all national parks. The NPS considered that these changes, which would increase entrance fees from $25 to $75, were appropriate because they only targeted the most popular parks, which already have entrance fees. However, there was a nearly unanimous public backlash against this proposal; many families felt this would prohibit them from being able to visit the parks.

Further, there was concern that this hike would disproportionately affect low-income families, who are already underrepresented in visitation to national parks. Additionally, many organizations working to increase access to nature for families of color, such as Latino Outdoors and African American Nature and Parks Experience, spoke out against these proposed fee hikes.

Altogether, more than 110,000 comments were posted on the NPS website, with 98% of them protesting this change. Representative Raul Grijalva commented, “This is a prime example that activism works.” In response to this strong public reaction, on April 12, 2018, Secretary Zinke released a statement replacing this plan with a more moderate proposal to raise prices incrementally across all parks with entrance fees.

See also
List of the United States National Park System official units

References

National Park Service areas
Areas
fee areas in the United States National Park System
NPS
NPS
NPS
NPS
NPS
Park
NPS
NPS
NPS
National Park Service